Sentient is an automated intelligence analysis system under development by the National Reconnaissance Office (NRO) of the United States federal government.

A 2012 internal NRO document, declassified in 2019, describes it as "an on-going Research  and Development (R&D) program, which is managed and operates out of the National Reconnaissance Office (NRO). The program architecture was developed to demonstrate advanced technologies and techniques to revolutionize the current Tasking, Collection, Processing, Exploitation, and Dissemination (TCPED) cycle across the Intelligence Community (IC). The Sentient methodology represents a fully integrated intelligence approach consisting of three fundamentals: problem-centric intelligence multi-INT end-to-end and trusted machine automation.".

According to Robert Cardillo, a former director of the National Geospatial-Intelligence Agency, the system is intended to use "automated inferencing" to aid intelligence collection.

The Verge described Sentient as “an omnivorous analysis tool, capable of devouring data of all sorts, making sense of the past and present, anticipating the future, and pointing satellites toward what it determines will be the most interesting parts of that future.”

References 

Intelligence analysis
Automated reasoning